Sardar Farooq Amanullah Dreshak is a Pakistani politician who has been a member of the Provincial Assembly of the Punjab since August 2018.

Political career

He was elected to the Provincial Assembly of the Punjab as a candidate of Pakistan Tehreek-e-Insaf from Constituency PP-295 (Rajanpur-III) in 2018 Pakistani general election.

References

Living people
Pakistan Tehreek-e-Insaf MPAs (Punjab)
Year of birth missing (living people)